The men's road race at the 1979 UCI Road World Championships was the 46th edition of the event. The race took place on Sunday 26 August 1979 in Valkenburg, the Netherlands. The race was won by Jan Raas of the Netherlands.

Final classification

References

Men's Road Race
UCI Road World Championships – Men's road race
1979 Super Prestige Pernod